Tsoi (Russian: Цой; working title - 47) is a 2020 Russian feature film  directed by Alexei Uchitel, a joint production of Russia, Lithuania, and Latvia, telling the story of how a car accident (which resulted in Viktor Tsoi's death) participant carries the singer's coffin from Jūrmala to Leningrad (modern Saint Petersburg). However, there is no character named "Viktor Tsoi" in the movie. "There isn't even Tsoi in the Tsoi"— said "Komsomolskaya Pravda",: while a review by "Argumenty i Fakty" was titled "Tsoi without Tsoi".

Production 
This wasn't the first time Uchitel addressed Tsoi's figure. His filmography includes documentary films "Rock" (one of the novels dedicated to the musician) and "Last Hero", in which Uchitel for the first time investigates the reasons behind the singer's tragic passing. The director calls Tsoi a continuation of that storyline and the plot - an assumption of what might have happened in August 1990. Uchitel claims that after the accident he witnessed the ill-fated bus, furthermore, talked with the case investigator and with the "Ikarus" driver.

First mentions of a project with a working title 47 refer to 2017. Uchitel postponed the beginning of production due to problems with a previous film Matilda, so the shooting began only on July 8, 2019. It took place in Saint Petersburg, Kaliningrad, Pskov region, and Latvia.

Alexei Uchitel refused to artistically depict Viktor Tsoi in any way, instead using archival videotape recordings with the singer in the vast majority of the scenes. The only such scene, in which Viktor Tsoi was shown from the back, was shot to illustrate the accident. It was entirely generated by a neural network since the film crew couldn't find an actor with the right shape of the occiput. 

Viktor Tsoi's son Alexander has asked to change the characters' names.

According to the director, Igor Vdovin, who worked with "Kino" musicians (project "Symphonic KINO"), refused to write music for the film.

Plot 
The Tsoi himself isn't in the movie: the characters are on the bus that's carrying the musician's coffin from Jūrmala to Leningrad. The film begins with a shot from the accident where Tsoi passed; alternating shots of the singer's car interior and the bus. The film ends with an alternate scene without the accident, which is revealed to be the artist's pre-death dream. In it, the bus and the car safely cross each other.

Cast

Release 
The premiere was scheduled for September 3, 2020, however, on August 27 the decision was made to indefinitely hold over the release of the film. On September 2 the inclusion of the movie in the competitive program of the 36th Warsaw Film Festival was announced, where, on October 12, its international premiere was held. Cinema Foundation of Russia announced their financial support of the film among other ten movies planned for screening in the 3rd and 4th quarters of 2020. The Russian premiere took place in Moscow on November 9, 2020. The film had a wide release on November 12.

After the film's release, Alexander Tsoi filed a lawsuit against the film distributors for "illegal use of his father's image in the feature film Tsoi". However, the claim was dismissed.

Reception 
Alexander Tsoi, with whom the director had, in his words, «heated conversations», assessed the film before its premiere.

The father and son of the Kino leader, calling the film a "low-minded sight", requested Putin to "organize an inspection" and "take appropriate measures" to prevent defamation of their relative's name. Alexander Tsoi was the request's initiator. The message emphasizes that "the creators of Tsoi didn't receive consent to the usage of the musician's name and image from neither the successors, nor the "Kino" musicians, nor other right holders or persons concerned". Yet, despite letters to the Ministry of Culture, the film was issued a rental certificate".

Rashid Nugmanov stated: "Alexei renamed the film from 47 to Tsoi, which is a direct violation of image rights… This is an outright deceit that can't be justified by any verbiage".

The director rejects all accusations of defacing Tsoi's figure.

The film received controversial responses from critics after its release on October 12, 2020 (one of the reviews was titled "Tsoi is dead"). Film expert Olga Galitskaia wrote: "Speculative, devoid of any viability idea that Uchitel stubbornly cherished for as much as ten years brought into the world a dull, dreary movie". Rock journalist, music critic and writer Artemy Troitsky called the film "a betrayal to Tsoi's life and death memory", whereas journalist and theatre expert Marina Timasheva— "another speculation on someone's name". Magazine's "Bear" chief editor Boris Minaev wrote: "Tsoi is alive, however, the film is not, unlike Leto, where everyone is alive, though remembering the plot is practically impossible".

Writer Platon Besedin expressed an opinion that "Uchitel, from a competent director, turned into a merchant artisan... It's actually really profitable to take someone's name... and shoot who knows what, claiming: what do you mean? It's fiction, all similarities are coincidental. Okay, let it be, but why are you, pest, making such a name then?

Sound producer Aleksei Vishnia: "The film isn't about anything at all... The picture isn't about Tsoi but about rock. Except not about musical rock but an evil one... Was it worth making or naming it Tsoi? In my opinion, the answer is obvious". InterMedia journalist Vadim Bogdanov believes that the film "consists of a set of ridiculous coincidences, artificial characters, violation of causality and dialogues, written by a person who not even once heard an ounce of human speech... Alexei Uchitel merely made a very bad film". Producer and public figure Joanna Stingray called Tsoi "nothing short of nonsense, a continuous fantasy about a real person".

Reviews 

 «Argumenty i Fakty»:

 «Komsomolskaya Pravda»:

 «Izvestia»

References 

2020s Russian-language films
2020 films
Films directed by Alexei Uchitel
Russian drama films
Latvian drama films